The Embassy of Cape Verde in Washington, D.C. is the diplomatic mission of the Republic of Cape Verde to the United States. It is located at 3415 Massachusetts Avenue, Northwest, Washington, D.C., in the Embassy Row neighborhood.

The Ambassador is Dr Carlos Wahnon Veiga.

Building

The home was built in 1911 for Representative Joseph W. Babcock, chairman of the United States House Committee on the District of Columbia, by architect Arthur B. Heaton, who also built several distinguished residences in the area. After changing ownership several times, the house was purchased by the Republic of Cape Verde in 1982 and has since served as their embassy.

References

External links

Cape Verde website

Cape Verde
Washington, D.C.
Cape Verde–United States relations
Cape Verde